In mathematics, Painlevé transcendents are solutions to certain nonlinear second-order ordinary differential equations in the complex plane with the Painlevé property (the only movable singularities are poles), but which are not generally solvable in terms of elementary functions. They were discovered by
,
,
, and
.

History
Painlevé transcendents have their origin in the study of special functions, which often arise as solutions of differential equations, as well as in the study of isomonodromic deformations of linear differential equations.  One of the most useful classes of special functions are the elliptic functions.  They are defined by second order ordinary differential equations whose singularities have  the Painlevé property: the only movable singularities are poles. This  property is rare in nonlinear equations. Poincaré and L. Fuchs showed that any first order equation with the  Painlevé property can be transformed into the Weierstrass elliptic function or the Riccati equation, which can all be solved explicitly in terms of integration and previously known special functions. Émile Picard pointed out that for orders greater than 1, movable essential singularities can occur, and found a special case of what was later called Painleve VI equation (see below).
(For orders greater than 2 the solutions can have moving natural boundaries.) Around 1900,  Paul Painlevé   studied second order differential equations with no movable singularities. He found that up to certain transformations, every such equation 
of the form

(with  a rational function) can be put into one of  fifty canonical forms (listed in ).
 found that  forty-four of the fifty equations are reducible in the sense that they can be solved in terms of previously known functions, leaving just six equations requiring the introduction of new special functions to solve them. There were some computational errors,
and as a result he missed three of the equations, including the general form of Painleve VI.
The errors were fixed and classification completed by Painlevé's student Bertrand Gambier. Independently of Painlevé and Gambier, equation Painleve VI was found
by Richard Fuchs from completely different considerations:
he studied isomonodromic deformations of linear differential equations with regular singularities.
These six second order nonlinear differential equations are called the Painlevé equations and their solutions are called the Painlevé transcendents.

The most general form of the sixth equation was missed by Painlevé, but was discovered in 1905 by Richard Fuchs (son of Lazarus Fuchs), as the differential equation satisfied by the singularity of a second order Fuchsian equation with 4 regular singular points on the projective line  under monodromy-preserving deformations.

 tried to extend Painlevé's work to higher order equations, finding some third order equations with the Painlevé property.

List of Painlevé equations

These six equations, traditionally called Painlevé I-VI, are as follows:

By rescaling  and  one can choose two of the parameters for type III, and one of the parameters for type V, so these types really have only 2 and 3 independent parameters.

Singularities

The singularities of solutions of these equations are 
The point , and
The point 0 for types III, V and VI, and
The point 1 for type VI, and
Possibly some movable poles

For type I, the singularities are (movable) double poles of residue 0, and the solutions all have an infinite number of such poles in the complex plane. The functions with a double pole at  have the Laurent series expansion

The number of poles in a ball of radius  grows roughly like a constant times .

For type II, the singularities are all (movable) simple poles.

Degenerations
The first five Painlevé equations are degenerations of the sixth equation.
More precisely, some of the equations are degenerations of others according to the following diagram (see , p.380), which also gives the corresponding degenerations  of the Gauss hypergeometric function (see , p.372)

Hamiltonian systems
The Painlevé equations can all be represented as Hamiltonian systems.

Example: If we put

then the second Painlevé equation 

is equivalent to the Hamiltonian system

for the Hamiltonian

Symmetries
A Bäcklund transformation is a transformation of the dependent and independent variables of a differential equation that transforms it to a similar equation. The Painlevé equations all have discrete groups of
Bäcklund transformations acting on them, which can be used to generate new solutions from known ones.

Example type I

The set of solutions of the type I Painlevé equation 

is acted on by the order 5 symmetry ,  where 
is a fifth root of 1. There are two solutions invariant under this transformation, one with a pole of order 2 at 0, and the other with a zero of order 3 at 0.

Example type II

In the Hamiltonian formalism of the type II Painlevé equation

with 

two Bäcklund transformations are given by

and

see below).

Okamoto discovered that the parameter space of each Painlevé equation can be identified with the Cartan subalgebra of a semisimple Lie algebra, such that actions of the affine Weyl group lift to Bäcklund transformations of the equations. The Lie algebras for 

Relation to other areas

One of the main reasons for which Painlevé equations are studied is their relations with monodromy
of linear systems with regular singularities; in particular, Painlevé VI was discovered
by Richard Fuchs because of this relation. This subject is described
in the article on isomonodromic deformation.

The  Painlevé equations are all reductions of integrable partial differential equations; see .

The  Painlevé equations are all reductions of the self dual Yang-Mills equations; see .

The Painlevé transcendents appear in random matrix theory in the formula for the Tracy–Widom distribution, the 2D Ising model, the asymmetric simple exclusion process and in two-dimensional quantum gravity.

References

 

  See sections 7.3, chapter 8, and the Appendices

.

External links
 Clarkson, P.A. Painlevé Transcendents, Chapter 32 of the NIST Digital Library of Mathematical Functions
 Joshi, Nalini What is this thing called Painlevé?
 Takasaki, Kanehisa Painlevé Equations
 
 

Special functions
Ordinary differential equations